Nathan Lee Broome (born 3 January 2002) is an English professional footballer who plays for AFC Wimbledon as a goalkeeper.

Career
After playing youth football with Manchester City and Stoke City, Broome signed for AFC Wimbledon in January 2022.

References

External links

2002 births
Living people
English footballers
Manchester City F.C. players
Stoke City F.C. players
AFC Wimbledon players
Association football goalkeepers
England youth international footballers